Benjamin "Benji" Kikanović (born January 6, 2000) is an American professional soccer player who plays as a forward for Major League Soccer club San Jose Earthquakes.

Career

College and amateur
Kikanović played two years of college soccer at California State University, Sacramento between 2018 and 2019, making 34 appearances, scoring 9 goals and tallying 5 assists.

In 2019, Kikanović played with NPSL side Sacramento Gold.

Professional career
On January 13, 2020, Kikanović joined USL Championship side Reno 1868. He had been scouted at a San Jose Earthquakes combine and was offered a contract with Reno, their USL affiliate. Reno folded their team on November 6, 2020, due to the financial impact of the COVID-19 pandemic.

On February 16, 2021, Kikanović joined MLS side San Jose Earthquakes on a one-year deal with club options through the 2024 MLS season.

Personal life
Kikanović was born in San Jose, California and is of Bosnian descent. He grew up in Antelope, California and played in AYSO, Placer United and at Antelope High School.

References

External links
Sac State bio
Reno 1868 bio

2000 births
Living people
American soccer players
American people of Bosnia and Herzegovina descent
Association football forwards
Sacramento State Hornets men's soccer players
Reno 1868 FC players
Soccer players from Sacramento, California
National Premier Soccer League players
USL Championship players
Sacramento Gold FC players
San Jose Earthquakes players
Major League Soccer players